The Dourbie is a  long river in southern France. It is a left tributary of the Tarn. Its source is north of Le Vigan, in the Cévennes. It flows generally west through the following departments and towns:

 Gard: Dourbies
 Aveyron: Saint-Jean-du-Bruel, Nant

The Dourbie flows into the Tarn at Millau.

References

Rivers of France
Rivers of Occitania (administrative region)
Rivers of Gard
Rivers of Aveyron